The European Media Management Association (EMMA) is an international not-for-profit organisation for professionals and academics in media management.

EMMA was founded in 2003 as the European Media Management Education Association, but was renamed European Media Management Association in 2014. It has some 150 members for 20 European universities. The main activity of EMMA is the annual conference.

A biannual doctoral summer school is organised.  The EMMA flagship journal is the Journal of Media Business Studies.

Executive board 

 President: Ulrike Rohn from Tallinn University / (Baltic Film and Media School)
 Deputy President: Päivi Maijanen from LUT University
 Secretary: Sari Virta from Metropolia University
 Treasurer: Ramona Dremljuga from Tallinn University / (Baltic Film and Media School)
 Special Projects / Special Interest Groups: Sabine Baumann from Jade University of Applied Sciences
 Communication Portfolio: Bianca Harms from NHL Stenden University and University of Groningen
 Summer School: Miguel Crespo from ISCTE- University Institute of Lisbon
 Conference: Joaquin Cestino from Jönköping University

EMMA presidents 

 2003-2005: Alfonso Sanchez-Tabernero from Universidad de Navarra
 2006-2008: Heinz-Werner Niestedt from Johannes Gutenberg University Mainz (JGU) 
 2008-2010: Lucy Küng from University of Oxford
 2010-2012: Charles Brown from Westminster University
 2012-2016: Gregory Ferrell Lowe University of Tampere

Previous conferences 

 2019 Limassol
 2018 Warsaw
 2017 Ghent
 2016 Portugal  
 2015 Hamburg
 2014 Tallinn
 2013 Bournemouth
 2012 Budapest
 2011 Moscow
 2010 London
 2009 Paris
 2008 Barcelona
 2007 Zurich

References

External links
 Official website
 Journal of Media Business Studies

Communications and media organizations
Educational organizations based in Europe